Xenophoroidea is a  superfamily of sea snails, marine gastropod molluscs  in the clade Littorinimorpha.

Taxonomy
The following families have been recognized in the taxonomy of Bouchet & Rocroi (2005):

family Xenophoridae
family † Lamelliphoridae

References

Littorinimorpha